Ängsbacka is a course and festival center focused on personal development, yoga, Tantra, dance, meditation, spirituality and self-expression. It is located in Molkom, Sweden, and was started in 1996.

The center hosts an average of eight festivals per year, mainly during the summer. Although Ängsbacka's Tantra Festival is the largest in Sweden, the No Mind Festival is the largest of the festivals with around a thousand participants. Vegetarian food is served.

It is registered as a not-for-profit organization owned by members and is run in a large part by volunteers.

The course center and its No Mind Festival were the feature of the 2008 documentary Three Miles North of Molkom.

More than one-fifth of the approximately 500 people who attended the Ängsbacka Tantra Festival in the last five days of July, 2021 developed confirmed COVID-19 infections. Proof of a negative COVID-19 test was not required for entry, and most of those who developed infection had not been vaccinated.

References

External links
  – official site
 Festival @ Ängsbacka – Ängsbacka Course & Festival Center YouTube channel

Education in Sweden
Festivals in Sweden
Värmland County